Pucallpa is a genus of beetles in the family Cerambycidae, containing the following species:

 Pucallpa cristata Lane, 1959
 Pucallpa robusta Monné, 1978

References

Acanthocinini